Tatiana Aleeva (born 1 March 1991) is a Russian weightlifter. She is a two-time silver medalist at the European Weightlifting Championships, both in 2017 and in 2019.

In 2018, she competed in the women's 64kg event at the World Weightlifting Championships held in Ashgabat, Turkmenistan.

She was provisionally suspended in August 2020 after testing positive for a banned substance.

References

External links 
 

Living people
1991 births
Place of birth missing (living people)
Russian female weightlifters
European Weightlifting Championships medalists
21st-century Russian women